The 1947 Temple Owls football team was an American football team that represented Temple University during the 1947 college football season.  In its second season under head coach William Leckonby, the team compiled a 3–6 record and was outscored by a total of 128 to 91. The team played its home games at Temple Stadium in Philadelphia.

Schedule

References

Temple
Temple Owls football seasons
Temple Owls football